The Museum of Outdoor Sculpture of Alcala de Henares (Museo de Escultura al Aire Libre de Alcalá de Henares) is a permanent exhibition of contemporary art in public Alcalá de Henares (Madrid — Spain), opened in 1993 and organized by the sculptor José Noja.

History 
The museum was started in 1991 by sculptor José Noja inaugurated in August 1993. The collection consists of 58 sculptures both figurative and abstract art, modern and contemporary works mainly Spanish artists, as well as Americans and Europeans. The sculptures are arranged in two urban sections: along the Complutense Avenue (Vía Complutense), and bordering the old city walls. This makes it the longest in its class of all Europe, with more than two kilometers long. There are interesting statues of important artists such as Amadeo Gabino, José Lamiel, Pablo Serrano or Úrculo, among others.

Sculptors 
The collection includes works by the following sculptors:

Sculpture gallery

See also 

 List of contemporary art museums
 Museo Nacional Centro de Arte Reina Sofía de Madrid
 Museo Nacional de Escultura Colegio de San Gregorio de Valladolid
 Open-air museum

References

External links 
 Museums of Alcalá de Henares
 Urban sculpture
 José Noja
 Alejandro Blanco photographs of the sculptures of the Museum
 Daniel Rocal photographs of the sculptures of the Museum
 Félix Abánades photographs of the sculptures of the Museum
  Miguel Arroyo photographs of the sculptures of the Museum
 M. Peinado photographs of the sculptures of the Museum

Art museums and galleries in Alcalá de Henares
Contemporary art galleries in Spain
Modern art museums in Spain
Open-air museums in Spain
Outdoor sculptures in Spain
Public art
Sculpture galleries in Spain
Sculpture gardens, trails and parks in Europe
Art museums established in 1993
1993 establishments in Spain
Buildings and structures in Alcalá de Henares